Erik Berthild Ruben "Blomman" Blomqvist (4 November 1896 – 14 January 1967) was a Swedish track and field athlete who competed at the 1920 and 1924 Summer Olympics. In 1920 he finished eighth in the javelin throw and 16th in the shot put. Four years later he placed sixth in the javelin throw. Blomqvist won the national javelin title in 1915, 1916, 1922, 1923, 1925 and 1929, finishing second or third in between.

References

1896 births
1967 deaths
Swedish male javelin throwers
Swedish male shot putters
Olympic athletes of Sweden
Athletes (track and field) at the 1920 Summer Olympics
Athletes (track and field) at the 1924 Summer Olympics
Athletes from Stockholm
20th-century Swedish people